Ein Iron (lit. Spring of Iron) is a moshav in northern Israel. Located in the eastern Sharon plain to the north-east of Hadera, it falls under the jurisdiction of Menashe Regional Council.

History
Ein Iron was established in 1934 by immigrants of the Second Aliyah, mainly Polish Jews, later joined by German Jews. Its name is derived from the fact that it overlooks Nahal Iron.

Economy
Fishbein farm produces an alcoholic (12%) passion fruit beverage.

References

Moshavim
Populated places established in 1934
Jewish villages in Mandatory Palestine
Populated places in Haifa District
1934 establishments in Mandatory Palestine
German-Jewish culture in Israel
Polish-Jewish culture in Israel